Artemis Rising Foundation is a nonprofit organization and film production and television production company, founded by Regina K. Scully. 

The company has produced films including The Invisible War (2012), The Hunting Ground (2015), The Breadwinner (2017), Won't You Be My Neighbor? (2018), Knock Down the House (2019), The Truffle Hunters (2020), On the Record (2020), Ailey (2021) and Bring Your Own Brigade (2021).

History
The organization was founded by Regina K. Scully to produce documentary and narrative film and television projects focusing on social justice issues.

The company has produced acclaimed films which have gone onto receive Academy Award and Primetime Emmy award wins and nominations including The Invisible War, by Kirby Dick, The Square directed by Jehane Noujaim, Brave Miss World by Cecilia Peck, The Hunting Ground (2015),  The Tale (2018) by Jennifer Fox, and The Great Hack (2019), directed by Jehane Noujaim and Karim Amer.

The company has also produced the television series College Behind Bars for PBS, 16 and Recovering for MTV,  The Vow and Allen v. Farrow for HBO.

Filmography

References

External links
 
 Artemis Rising Foundation at IMDb

Film production companies of the United States